Choi Pil-soo (born 30 April 1991) is a South Korean footballer who plays as goalkeeper for Seongnam FC.

Career
He was selected by FC Anyang in the 2014 K League draft.

References

External links 

1991 births
Living people
Association football midfielders
South Korean footballers
FC Anyang players
Gimcheon Sangmu FC players
Busan IPark players
Seongnam FC players
K League 1 players
K League 2 players
Sungkyunkwan University alumni
Place of birth missing (living people)